Emilio Bonfigli (22 August 1902 – 19 August 1987) was an Italian boxer who competed in the 1924 Summer Olympics. In 1924 he was eliminated in the first round of the middleweight class after losing his fight to Daniel Daney.

References

External links
 
 Italian Olympians BONF-BONI 

1902 births
1987 deaths
Sportspeople from Ancona
Middleweight boxers
Olympic boxers of Italy
Boxers at the 1924 Summer Olympics
Italian male boxers